Supercard of Honor IV was the 4th Supercard of Honor professional wrestling event produced by Ring of Honor (ROH), which took place on April 3, 2009 at George R. Brown Convention Center in Houston, Texas.

Storylines
Supercard of Honor IV featured professional wrestling matches, which involved different wrestlers from pre-existing scripted feuds, plots, and storylines that played out on ROH's television programs. Wrestlers portrayed villains or heroes as they followed a series of events that built tension and culminated in a wrestling match or series of matches.

Results

See also	
2009 in professional wrestling

References

External links
 Ring of Honor's official website

2009 in professional wrestling
Events in Texas
2009 in Texas
ROH Supercard of Honor
Events in Houston
Professional wrestling in Texas
April 2009 events in the United States